Volodymyr Matviichuk (also transliterated Matviychuk, born 29 December 1982) is a Ukrainian amateur lightweight boxer. He won a bronze medal at the 2011 European Championships and competed at the 2016 Olympics, where he was eliminated in the first bout. Matviichuk has degrees in economics and coaching from Zhytomyr State Technological University.

References

External links

 
 
 

1982 births
Living people
Ukrainian male boxers
Light-welterweight boxers
Olympic boxers of Ukraine
Boxers at the 2016 Summer Olympics
Place of birth missing (living people)
21st-century Ukrainian people